MS Stena Europe is a ferry owned by Stena Line and operated on its Fishguard—Rosslare service.

Early career
MS Stena Europe was built in 1981 by the Götaverken shipyard in Gothenburg, Sweden as MS Kronprinsessan Victoria for Sessan Line. During the same year Sessan Line passed into the ownership of Stena Line. Kronprisessan Victoria was used as a day ferry on the Gothenburg - Frederikshavn route until March 1982 when the vessel was converted to a night ferry for the Gothenburg - Kiel route. This involved building a  large numbers of additional cabins onto the upper vehicle deck to make her suitable as an overnight ship. She was a sister vessel to MS Prinsessan Birgitta, later known as  MS Normandy.

In 1988, MS Kronprinsessan Victoria was sent for rebuilding to make her more suitable for use on the Oslo - Fredrikshavn route, this involved building more cabins which saw an accommodation block added on the top deck. MS Kronprisessan Victoria was renamed MS Stena Saga prior to entering service on the Oslo - Fredrikshavn route.

The vessel was transferred to the Hook of Holland - Harwich route in 1994. MS Stena Saga was refitted prior to transfer; this mainly involved removing the accommodation block that was added to the top deck in 1988. The vessel was then renamed MS Stena Europe. Following the introduction of the HSS Stena Discovery on the Hook of Holland - Harwich route in June 1997, the MS Stena Europe was withdrawn from the route. She was transferred to Stena Line's subsidiary Lion Ferry as MS Lion Europe entering service on the Karlskrona - Gdynia route. In 1998 all Lion Ferry routes and vessel were transferred to the Stena Line banner. Following this she reverted to the name Stena Europe. Between 1997 and 2001, she served on Stena Line's Karlskrona - Gdynia route.

Transfer to the Irish Sea
In late 2001 Stena Line announced that the Koningin Beatrix and MS Stena Europe would swap routes in early 2002. In January 2002 MS Stena Europe entered the City Shipyard at Gothenburg to undergo a GBP4.5 million refit. All the main passenger lounges were refurbished and the cabins installed on the upper vehicle deck in 1982 were removed returning the latter to something like their original state. With freight capacity fully restored the vessel is once again very much a day ferry. Following berthing trials the MS Stena Europe entered service on its new route on 13 March 2002.

MS Stena Europe has proved a popular ship on the Fishguard - Rosslare route. She shared Rosslare for a time with her sister ship, that was then operating Irish Ferries' services to France. She also shared the Fishguard - Rosslare route with the Stena Lynx III during the summer months until the end of Summer 2011 when Stena Lynx III ceased operating the route.

In June 2005 MS Stena Europe covered on the Holyhead - Dublin route for eleven days while MS Stena Adventurer was on annual overhaul. In November 2008 MS Stena Europe received an €850,000 refurbishment to some of its main passenger lounges. The most recent interior upgrade was completed in May / June 2010 which brought about a revamped Stena Plus area a new Barista Coffee bar, and a new seating Lounge on Deck 7. In 2011 the MS Stena Europe was off service twice, once for overhaul in January and again in April for the replacement of an engine in Falmouth. MS Stena Europe went for annual refit in late January 2012 and returned to service on 3 February 2012. In March 2019, Stena Europe arrived at Gemak's Tuzla yard in Turkey for life extension work returning to her usual Fishguard <> Rosslare route in early October.

Incidents
In January 2003 Stena Europe was in the news when she lost power near Tuskar Rock, just off the Irish coast. Five helicopters were scrambled to winch 155 passengers to safety, but the rescue was aborted as engineers brought the ship back under her own power.
On 6 June 2009, the ferry was called to assist in the rescue of a sailor that had fallen overboard from another vessel in the Irish Sea. The incident happened during the ship’s regular journey from Rosslare to Fishguard.
On the evening of 26 October 2012, Stena Line reported on Facebook that a minor incident occurred at Rosslare Port involving Stena Europe and the Irish Ferries Oscar Wilde vessel. The 454 passengers and 71 crew on board were said to be safe, although the return crossing to Fishguard was cancelled.
On the evening of 11th February 2023 a fire was reported in the Engine Room of the vessel whilst en-route to Fishguard from Rosslare.  The vessel was able to reach the berth with assistance from Tugs where fire crews from Mid & West Wales Fire & Rescue Service boarded the vessel however the vessels crew had extinguished the blaze.

References

Ferries of the United Kingdom
Ships built in Gothenburg
Europe
1980 ships